Kuźnica is a Polish toponym meaning Hammer mill, it may refer to:

Kuźnica, Pomeranian Voivodeship (north Poland), a district of the seaside town of Jastarnia
Kuźnica railway station
Kuźnica, Kuyavian-Pomeranian Voivodeship (north-central Poland)
Kuźnica, Podlaskie Voivodeship (north-east Poland)
Kuźnica, Gmina Rusiec in Łódź Voivodeship (central Poland)
Kuźnica, Gmina Zelów in Łódź Voivodeship (central Poland)
Kuźnica, Gmina Nowa Brzeźnica in Łódź Voivodeship (central Poland)
Kuźnica, Gmina Sulmierzyce in Łódź Voivodeship (central Poland)
Kuźnica, Radomsko County in Łódź Voivodeship (central Poland)
Kuźnica, Wieluń County in Łódź Voivodeship (central Poland)
Kuźnica, Masovian Voivodeship (east-central Poland)
Kuźnica, Greater Poland Voivodeship (west-central Poland)
Kuźnica, Silesian Voivodeship (south Poland)
Kuźnica, Opole Voivodeship (south-west Poland)

See also
Stara Kuźnica (disambiguation)